Dale is a given name.

Notable people with this name
 Dale Baum (born 1943), American historian and professor
Dale Ann Bradley, American bluegrass musician
 Dale Berry (born 1960), American commercial artist and designer
 Dale Bozzio (born 1955), lead singer of Missing Persons
 Dale Brown (born 1956), American author
 Dale Brown (basketball) (born 1935), American football, track, basketball player and coach
 Dale Brown (boxer) (born 1971), Canadian boxer
 Dale Campbell-Savours, British politician
 Dale Carnegie (1888–1955), motivational speaker and author
 Dale Chihuly (born 1941), American glass sculptor and entrepreneur
 Dale Clausnitzer (born 1951), American politician and businessman
 Dale Cook (born 1958), American kickboxer
 Dale Copley (born 1991), Australian Rugby League player
 Dale Earnhardt (1951–2001), American race car driver
 Dale Earnhardt Jr. (born 1974), American race car driver, son of Dale Earnhardt, Sr.
 Dale Evans (1912–2001), American actress and singer, also known as wife of Roy Rogers
 Dale Finucane (born 1991), Australian Rugby League player
 Dale Folwell (born 1958), American politician
 Dale Hey (born 1945), American professional wrestler better known as Buddy Roberts
 H. Dale Jackson (7 December 1930 – 15 February 2003), American Baptist minister
 Dale Messick (1906-2005), Brenda Starr American comic strip artist
 Dale Mitchell (baseball) (1921–1987), American baseball player
 Dale Mitchell (soccer) (born 1958), Canadian soccer player
 Dale Murphy (born 1956), American baseball player
 Dale Price (born c. 1925), Justice of the Arkansas Supreme Court 
 Dale Robertson (born 1923) American actor 
 Dale Samuels (born 1931), American football player
 Dale Sandler, American epidemiologist
 Dale Spender (born 1943), Australian feminist scholar, teacher, writer and consultant
 Dale Steyn (born 1983), South African cricketer
 Dale Van Sickel (1907–1977), American football player 
 Dale Walz (born 1964), American politician and police officer
 Dale Winton (1955–2018), British television presenter
 Dale E. Wolf (1924-2021), American businessman and politician
 Robert Dale Slocum, American botanist and biologist

Fictional characters
Chip 'n' Dale, fictional cartoon characters
Dale Arden, the fellow-adventurer and love interest of Flash Gordon
Dale Cooper, the main character of the TV series Twin Peaks
Dale Gribble, from King of the Hill
Dale Horvath, from the comic book series The Walking Dead and from the American television series of the same name
Dale McGillicutty, from Teenage Mutant Ninja Turtles comic book series

See also
Dale (surname)
Dale (disambiguation)

Masculine given names
English masculine given names
English unisex given names